The Other End of the Tunnel  or  De Andere Kant van de Tunnel  is a 1994 Dutch film directed by Bob Entrop.

Cast
Linda van den Bremer		
Hanne Essen van	... 	Wedding guest
John Leddy		
Mimoun Oaïssa		
Truus te Selle		
Nikolai van den Hoek		
Johan Zeldenrust	... 	Wedding guest

External links 
 

Dutch drama films
1994 films
1990s Dutch-language films